Somila Jho (born 25 August 1995 in King William's Town, South Africa) is a South African rugby union player who last played for the  in the Currie Cup and in the Rugby Challenge. His regular position is outside centre.

Rugby career

Youth rugby

Jho attended Dale College in his home town of King William's Town and played first team rugby for them for three years from 2011 to 2013. In 2011, he played at the Under-16 Grant Khomo Week held in nearby Queenstown, playing as a flanker for Border in matches against KwaZulu-Natal and Boland scoring a try in the latter match. He was included in their squad for the Under-18 Craven Week – South Africa's most prestigious high schools rugby union tournament – in both 2012 and 2013. He was mainly used as a replacement during the 2012 tournament held in Port Elizabeth, but still weighed in with a try in their defeat to Limpopo. He started all three their matches at the 2013 event; after scoring a try in their 38–20 victory over Namibia in the first match, he also scored a brace in their 37–19 victory in the second match to finish the tournament as their second-highest try-scorer.

At the end of 2013, Jho moved to Grahamstown to enroll at Kingswood College, which is in the ' catchment area and he subsequently joined the academy of the Port Elizabeth-based union for the 2015 season. He played in all twelve of s' matches during the 2015 Under-21 Provincial Championship, the first season that the team competed in Group A of this competition, having won promotion from Group B in 2014. Jho was one of the top performers for a team that struggled to adjust at this level (winning just one of their matches), scoring five tries in the competition. His five tries were the most by any Eastern Province player and he was also the team's second-highest points scorer, with his contribution of 25 points just four less than that of fly-half MC Venter.

Eastern Province Kings

Personal life

References

South African rugby union players
Living people
1995 births
Sportspeople from Qonce
Rugby union centres
Eastern Province Elephants players
Rugby union players from the Eastern Cape